FK BSK Ledinci (Serbian Cyrillic: ФК БCK Лeдинци) was a Bosnian-Herzegovinian football club based in Batković, City of Bijeljina, Republika Srpska.

History
Ledinci had one season in the country's second tier-First League of the Republika Srpska, in 2003–04. The club ceased to exist in September 2020.

Club seasons

References

External links
 Football association of Republika Srpska 

Defunct football clubs in Bosnia and Herzegovina
Football clubs in Republika Srpska
Bijeljina